More Machine Than Man is an American industrial rock / coldwave / goth rock band.  It was formed by two musicians under the pseudonyms, Tasha Katrine and Tech (later changed to Robzilla).  
More Machine Than Man has independently released three full-length albums.  More Machine Than Man released one EP on the label Underground Inc. and one album on Black Flames Records.

From Seattle, More Machine Than Man independently released the 12 song album titled, Dark Matter in August 2012. Dark Matter includes two songs produced by En Esch of Slick Idiot and one song with a keyboard performance by Romell Regulacion of Razed in Black.

The band's live performances integrate original video content, created by Tasha Katrine and Robzilla.

Touring 
 MMTM Summer Tour 2001
 MMTM Fall Tour 2002
 Razed in Black Damaged Tour 2003  
 MMTM Incision 2004 Tour
 Eccentrik 2004
 Wave Gotik Treffen 2005
 Freaks United 2005
 Convergence (goth festival) 11 2005
 Slick Idiot xSCREWtiating tour 2006

Discography 
 Technophile, Demo, 1999 independently released
 Abduction Kit,  EP, 1999 independently released
 Robot, LP, 2000 independently released
 Electrolust, LP, 2001 Black Flames Records
 Notes from the Real Underground #3, Compilation, 2002 Underground Inc.
 Mutations: A Tribute to Alice Cooper, Compilation, 2002 Ankhor Records
 Binary  Sex,  EP, 2003 Underground Inc and Black Flames Records
 Dark Matter,  LP, 2012 independently released
 Something Ventured, Nothing Gained,  LP, Sep 18, 2014 Nilaihah Records

References

External links 
 Official MMTM site
 Official MMTM facebook
 Official MMTM SoundCloud
 Official MMTM YouTube Channel

American industrial rock musical groups
Musical groups from Boston
Cold wave groups
Musical groups established in 1999
Rock music duos
Underground, Inc. artists
1999 establishments in Massachusetts